Von Hippel is a German surname and may refer to:

 Arthur von Hippel (physician) (1841–1916), a German ophthalmologist
 Robert von Hippel (1866–1951), a German criminal lawyer, his son
 Arthur R. von Hippel (1898–2003), a German-American physicist, grandson of Arthur von Hippel and nephew of Eugen von Hippel
 Eric von Hippel  (born 1941), an American economist, son of Arthur R. von Hippel
 Frank N. von Hippel, an American nuclear physicist, son of Arthur R. von Hippel
 Eugen von Hippel (1867–1939), a German ophthalmologist, his son (discoverer of Von Hippel–Lindau disease)
 Karin von Hippel
 Theodor Gottlieb von Hippel the Elder (1741–1796), a German satirist
 Theodor Gottlieb von Hippel the Younger (1775–1843), a Prussian statesman, his nephew
 Theodor von Hippel, a German army and intelligence officer during World War II